Byakuya (written: 白夜 lit. "white night", "short night", or "night under the midnight sun")  may refer to:

Byakuya (True Light), a song by Shunichi Miyamoto
Four Nights of a Dreamer, a 1971 French film directed by Robert Bresson, released in Japan as Byakuya
Byakuya (Under Night In Birth)

Fictional characters

Byakuya (InuYasha), a character in the anime and manga series InuYasha
Byakuya Kuchiki, a character in the anime and manga series Bleach
Byakuya Togami, a character in the visual novel and anime series Danganronpa
Byakuya, a character in the light novel and anime series Kakuriyo no Yadomeshi 
Byakuya Matō, a character in the light visual and anime Fate/Zero
Byakuya Jougasaki, a character in the light novel series Chivalry of a Failed Knight
Byakuya Ishigami, a character in the manga and anime series Dr. Stone

Japanese masculine given names